This a partial list of Minor League Baseball players in the Houston Astros system and the rosters of their minor league affiliates:

Players

Spencer Arrighetti

Spencer Zane Arrighetti (born January 2, 2001) is an American professional baseball pitcher in the Houston Astros organization.

Arrighetti attended Cinco Ranch High School in Katy, Texas and played college baseball at Navarro College, Texas Christian University (TCU) and the University of Louisiana at Lafayette. He was drafted by the Houston Astros in the sixth round of the 2021 Major League Baseball draft.

Arrighetti made his professional debut with the Florida Complex League Astros before being promoted to the Fayetteville Woodpeckers. He started 2022 with the Asheville Tourists before his promotion to the Corpus Christi Hooks.

Colin Barber

Colin Arthur Barber (born December 4, 2000) is an American baseball outfielder in the Houston Astros organization.

Barber grew up in Chico, California and attended Pleasant Valley High School. After breaking his leg early in his sophomore season, he batted .449 with 29 RBIs as a junior. As a senior, Barber batted .493 with 10 home runs and 42 RBIs. Barber committed to play college baseball at the University of Oregon.

Barber was selected in the fourth round of the 2019 Major League Baseball draft by the Houston Astros. He signed with the team and received a $1 million bonus. Barber was assigned to the Rookie League Gulf Coast League Astros and batted .263 with two home runs and 19 runs scored in 28 games played. After the 2020 minor league season was cancelled, he played in the temporary independent City of Champions Cup for the Chicago Deep Dish. In 2021, he appeared in 16 games for the Asheville Tourists of the High-A East before undergoing season-ending shoulder surgery.

Matthew Barefoot

Matthew Scott Barefoot (born September 20, 1997) is an American professional baseball outfielder in the Houston Astros organization.

Barefoot attended Midway High School in Newton Grove, North Carolina and played college baseball at Campbell University. In 2018, he played collegiate summer baseball with the Hyannis Harbor Hawks of the Cape Cod Baseball League, where he was named a league all-star and led the league in batting average with a .379 mark. Barefoot was drafted by the Houston Astros in the sixth round of the 2019 Major League Baseball draft.

Barefoot made his professional debut with the Tri-City ValleyCats, batting .155 over 23 games. He did not play a minor league game in 2020 due to the season being cancelled because of the COVID-19 pandemic. He started 2021 with the Fayetteville Woodpeckers before being promoted to the Asheville Tourists and Corpus Christi Hooks. Over 101 games between the two teams, he slashed .258/.311/.477 with twenty home runs, 68 RBIs, and 21 stolen bases.

Luke Berryhill

Luke Berryhill (born May 28, 1998) is an American professional baseball catcher in the Houston Astros organization.

Berryhill began his college career at Georgia Southern. After his freshman year he transferred to Walters State Community College. In his only season with the Senators, Berryhill batted .376 with 11 doubles, 13 home runs, and 45 RBIs. In 2019, he played collegiate summer baseball with the Brewster Whitecaps of the Cape Cod Baseball League. Berryhill transferred to South Carolina for his remaining eligibility. As a junior he hit .271 with 12 home runs and 49 RBIs.

Berryhill was selected in the 13th round by the Cincinnati Reds in the 2019 Major League Baseball draft. After signing with the team he was assigned to the Greeneville Reds of the Class A-Short Season Appalachian League, where he batted .240 in eight games played.

Berryhill did not play a minor league game in 2020 due to the cancellation of the minor league season caused by the COVID-19 pandemic. He was traded to the Houston Astros in exchange for pitcher Cionel Pérez on January 23, 2021. Berryhill began the 2021 season with the Low-A Fayetteville Woodpeckers. He was later promoted to the Asheville Tourists of High-A East and then promoted a second time to the Double-A Corpus Christi Hooks.

Georgia Southern Eagles bio
South Carolina Gamecocks bio

Jordan Brewer

Jordan Austin Brewer (born August 1, 1997) is an American professional baseball outfielder in the Houston Astros organization.

Brewer was born and grew up in St. Joseph, Michigan and attended St. Joseph High School, where he played baseball, basketball and football. In football, Brewer was named All-State as a wide receiver and committed to join the Michigan Wolverines football team as a preferred walk-on before he was forced to end his football career after dislocating his shoulder for a second time.

Brewer began his collegiate baseball career at Lincoln Trail College after receiving a scholarship to play at the school. He was named first team All-Great Rivers Athletic Conference after batting .368 with nine home runs, 42 RBIs, and 45 runs scored as a freshman and repeated as a first team selection as a sophomore after hitting .367 with three home runs, 31 RBIs, and 38 runs scored. Brewer committed to continue his collegiate career at Michigan. He batted .329 with 12 home runs and 59 RBIs with 25 stolen bases and was named the Big Ten Conference Baseball Player of the Year as the Wolverines went to the 2019 College World Series final.

Brewer was drafted in the third round by the Houston Astros in the 2019 Major League Baseball draft. He signed with the team and was assigned to the Tri-City ValleyCats of the Class A Short Season New York–Penn League with whom he batted .130 over 16 games.

Brewer did not play a minor league game in 2020 due to the cancellation of the minor league season caused by the COVID-19 pandemic. He spent the 2021 season with the Fayetteville Woodpeckers of the Low-A East, slashing .275/.375/.410 with six home runs, 41 RBIs, and 21 stolen bases.

Michigan Wolverines bio

Logan Cerny

Logan James Cerny (born September 28, 1999) is an American professional baseball outfielder in the Houston Astros organization.

Cerny grew up in Lawrenceville, Georgia and attended Parkview High School. As a senior, Cerny was named the GHSAA 7A Player of the Year and a MaxPreps All-American after he batted .397 with four triples, 10 home runs, 34 RBIs and 43 runs scored as Parkview won the GHSAA 7A state championship.

Cerny played college baseball career at Troy for three seasons. As a freshman, he hit for a .267 average with nine home runs and 42 RBIs. Cerny's sophomore season was cut short due to the coronavirus pandemic. As a junior, Cerny was named first team All-Sun Belt Conference after he batted .332 with 17 doubles, four triples, and 15 home runs with 49 runs scored and 47 RBIs.

Cerny was drafted in the 10th round by the Philadelphia Phillies in the 2021 Major League Baseball draft. He was assigned to the Rookie-level Florida Complex League Phillies to start his professional career before being promoted to the Low-A Clearwater Threshers. 

Cerny was traded to the Houston Astros in exchange for catcher Garrett Stubbs on November 19, 2021. The Astros assigned Cerny to the Single-A Fayetteville Woodpeckers at the beginning of the 2022 season. In 2022, he batted .253/.360/.472 for them. 

Troy Trojans bio

Brett Conine

Brett Michael Conine (born October 16, 1996) is an American professional baseball pitcher in the Houston Astros organization.

Conine attended El Modena High School in Orange, California, where he played three years of varsity baseball. In 2013, his sophomore year, he pitched to a 1.94 ERA over  innings. Undrafted in the 2015 Major League Baseball draft, he enrolled at California State University, Fullerton where he played college baseball.

In 2016, Conine's freshman year, he made 15 appearances (three starts) in which he went 3–3 with a 5.10 ERA, striking out 24 batters over thirty innings. As a sophomore in 2017, Conine moved into the closer role, compiling 15 saves and a 1.39 ERA over 31 relief appearances. In 2016 and 2017, he played collegiate summer baseball with the Wareham Gatemen of the Cape Cod Baseball League. In 2018, his junior season, he appeared in 32 games in relief, going 4–2 with a 4.09 ERA. After the season, he was selected by the Houston Astros in the 11th round of the 2018 Major League Baseball draft.

Conine signed with the Astros and made his professional debut that year with the Tri-City ValleyCats of the Class A Short Season New York–Penn League, going 1–1 with a 1.99 ERA over  innings. In 2019, he began the year with the Quad Cities River Bandits of the Class A Midwest League before being promoted to the Fayetteville Woodpeckers of the Class A-Advanced Carolina League in May. After 15 games with Fayetteville, he was promoted to the Corpus Christi Hooks of the Class AA Texas League in August, with whom he finished the year. Over 25 games (15 starts) between the three clubs, Conine went 8–4 with a 2.20 ERA, striking out 134 batters over  innings.

Conine did not play a minor league game in 2020 due to the cancellation of the minor league season caused by the COVID-19 pandemic. For the 2021 season, he was assigned to the Sugar Land Skeeters of the Triple-A West. After going 4–0 with a 0.95 ERA over 19 innings, he was named the Triple-A West Pitcher of the Month for May. Over 25 games (18 starts) for the Skeeters, Conine went 8–4 with a 5.66 ERA and 83 strikeouts over  innings pitched which led the team. He returned to Sugar Land for the 2022 season. Over 29 games (14 starts), he posted a 6-3 record with a 6.86 ERA and 87 strikeouts over  innings.

Zach Daniels

 Zachary Aaron Daniels (born January 23, 1999) is an American professional baseball outfielder in the Houston Astros organization.

Daniels attended Eagle's Landing High School in McDonough, Georgia and played college baseball at the University of Tennessee. He was drafted by the Houston Astros in the fourth round of the 2020 Major League Baseball draft.

Daniels spent his first professional season in 2021 with the Fayetteville Woodpeckers and Asheville Tourists. He played 2022 with Asheville.

Justin Dirden

Justin Lee Dirden (born July 16, 1997) is an American professional baseball outfielder in the Houston Astros organization.

Dirden attended Fort Zumwalt North High School in O'Fallon, Missouri, where he played baseball and led the team with a .391 batting average as a junior in 2014. Following his graduation in 2015, he enrolled at East Carolina University where he played three games as a freshman in 2016 before transferring to Jefferson College where he played one season. Dirden then transferred to Southeast Missouri State University where he batted .340 with 16 home runs and 68 RBIs over 56 starts for the 2018 season. He did not play in 2019 due to injury, and batted .414 with nine home runs over 17 games in 2020 before the college baseball season was cancelled due to the COVID-19 pandemic. He went unselected in the shortened 2020 Major League Baseball draft and signed with the Houston Astros as an undrafted free agent.

Dirden split his first professional season in 2021 between the Fayetteville Woodpeckers and Asheville Tourists, batting .274/.397/.537 with 15 home runs and 58 RBIs over 83 games. He opened the 2022 season with the Corpus Christi Hooks and was promoted to the Sugar Land Space Cowboys in early August. Over 124 games played between both teams, he slashed .302/.384/.558 with 40 doubles (tied with Matt Mervis for the minor league lead), 24 home runs, 101 RBIs, and 12 stolen bases.

SEMO Redhawks bio

Shawn Dubin

Shawn Anthony Dubin (born September 6, 1995) is an American professional baseball pitcher in the Houston Astros organization.

Dubin attended Allegany-Limestone High School in Allegany, New York and played college baseball at Georgetown College and the University at Buffalo. He was drafted by the Houston Astros in the 13th round of the 2018 Major League Baseball Draft.

Dubin made his professional debut in 2018 with the Low-A Tri-City ValleyCats, pitching to a 4.60 ERA in 14 appearances. In 2019, he pitched for the Single-A Quad Cities River Bandits and High-A Fayetteville Woodpeckers, accumulating a 7–5 record and 3.58 ERA with 151 strikeouts across 25 games (19 of them starts). Due to the cancellation of the 2020 Minor League Baseball season due to COVID-19, he did not pitch for a team, but was a member of the Astros' 60-man player pool.

The Astros invited Dubin to their Spring Training in 2021. He did not make the team and spent the year with the Triple-A Sugar Land Skeeters, working to a 3.44 ERA with 69 strikeouts in 49.2 innings of work across 16 contests. He was selected to the 40-man roster following the season on November 19, 2021.

Dubin was optioned to the Triple-A Sugar Land Space Cowboys to begin the 2023 season.

Jimmy Endersby

James Robery Endersby (born January 16, 1998) is an American professional baseball pitcher in the Houston Astros organization.

Endersby attended Orange High School in Orange, California where he played four years on the baseball team. As a senior in 2017, he was named the Most Valuable Player (MVP) of the Golden West League. After graduating, he enrolled at Cal State Fullerton where he started his collegiate career as an infielder before transitioning to a pitcher as a sophomore. He pitched only  innings combined in 2018 and 2019, and transferred to Concordia University Irvine following the end of the 2019 season. With Concordia in 2020, he started five games and went 5-0 with a 1.88 ERA and 37 strikeouts before the season was cancelled due to the COVID-19 pandemic.

Endersby went unselected in the 2020 Major League Baseball draft, and signed with the Houston Astros as an undrafted free agent. He made his professional debut in 2021 with the Asheville Tourists and was promoted to the Corpus Christi Hooks in mid-June. Over 24 games (17 starts) between the two teams, he went 7-7 with a 3.90 ERA and 110 strikeouts over 97 innings. He returned to Corpus Christi to open the 2022 season. In mid-July, after appearing in 16 games (with 12 starts) and compiling a 2-5 record with a 3.88 ERA and 66 strikeouts over 72 innings, he was promoted to the Sugar Land Space Cowboys. Over 12 games (eight starts) with Sugar Land, he went 2-3 with a 7.66 ERA over  innings.

Concordia Eagles bio

J.P. France

Jonathan Patrick France (born April 4, 1995) is an American professional baseball pitcher in the Houston Astros organization.

France grew up in Luling, Louisiana and attended Archbishop Shaw High School.

France began his college baseball career at Tulane. He missed his sophomore season while recovering from Tommy John surgery and used a medical redshirt. As a redshirt junior, France went 5–5 with a 3.84 ERA and 73 strikeouts over 96 innings pitched. After the season, he transferred to Mississippi State for his final year of eligibility.

France was selected in the 14th round of the 2018 MLB draft by the Houston Astros. After signing with the team he was assigned to the Tri-City ValleyCats of the New York–Penn League and was moved to the bullpen and was later promoted to the Class A Quad Cities River Bandits. France spent the 2019 season with the Fayetteville Woodpeckers of the Class A-Advanced Carolina League, where he was used primarily as a starting pitcher. He was assigned to the Double-A Corpus Christi Hooks prior to the start of the 2021 season before being promoted to the Triple-A Sugar Land Skeeters.

France was optioned to the Triple-A Sugar Land Space Cowboys to begin the 2023 season.

Tulane Green Wave bio
Mississippi State Bulldogs bio

Tyler Guilfoil

Tyler Guilfoil (born January 19, 2000) is an American baseball pitcher in the Houston Astros organization. 
 
Guilfoil grew up in Lexington, Kentucky and attended Lafayette High School.

Guilfoil began his college baseball career at Lipscomb. He was named second-team All-ASUN Conference as a junior after going 3-1 with a 3.25 ERA and 53 strikeouts in 17 relief appearances. Guilfoil transferred to Kentucky after the season. In his only season with the Wildcats, he made 21 relief appearances and went 3-1 with six saves and a 1.59 ERA while striking out 80 batters.

Guilfoil was selected by the Houston Astros in the 8th round of the 2022 Major League Baseball draft. After signing with the team he was assigned to the Rookie-level Florida Complex League Astros and was later promoted to the Single-A Fayetteville Woodpeckers. Guilfoil made seven pitching appearances between the two teams and struck out 31 batters and had a 0.52 ERA over  innings pitched.

Lipscomb Bisons bio
Kentucky Wildcats bio

Quincy Hamilton

Quincy Hamilton (born June 12, 1998) is an American professional baseball outfielder in the Houston Astros organization. He played college baseball for the Wright State Raiders.

Hamilton played college baseball at Wright State for four seasons. He batted .357 in 11 games during his sophomore season in 2020 before it was cut short due to the coronavirus pandemic. Hamilton was named the Horizon League Player of the Year after batting .374 with 18 doubles, 15 home runs, and a team-leading 65 RBIs.

Hamilton was selected in the fifth round of the 2021 Major League Baseball draft by the Houston Astros. After signing with the team he was assigned to the Fayetteville Woodpeckers of the Low-A East. Hamilton returned to Fayetteville at the beginning of the 2022 season. He slashed .291/.400/.485 and was leading the team with 39 hits, six home runs, 19 RBIs, and 22 runs scored through 32 games before being promoted to the High-A Asheville Tourists. Hamilton was promoted a second time to the Double-A Corpus Christi Hooks.

Wright State Raiders bio

Corey Julks

Corey Christopher Julks (born February 27, 1996) is an American professional baseball outfielder in the Houston Astros organization.

Julks attended Clear Brook High School in Friendswood, Texas and played college baseball at the University of Houston for the Houston Cougars. In 2015, he played collegiate summer baseball with the Bourne Braves of the Cape Cod Baseball League. As a junior in 2017, he started 57 games and batted .335 with nine home runs, 45 RBIs, and 15 stolen bases. He was selected by the Houston Astros in the eighth round of the 2017 Major League Baseball draft and signed.

Julks made his professional debut with the Tri-City ValleyCats of the Class A Short Season New York–Penn League where he batted .176 over 32 games. He began the 2018 season with the Quad Cities River Bandits of the Class A Midwest League before being promoted to the Beloit Snappers of the Class A-Advanced Carolina League. Over 125 games, he hit .270 with ten home runs and 62 RBIs. He split the 2019 season between the Fayetteville Woodpeckers of the Class A-Advanced Carolina League and the Corpus Christi Hooks of the Class AA Texas League, batting .256 with four home runs and 41 RBIs over 107 games. He did not play a game in 2020 due to the cancellation of the minor league season. Julks returned to Corpus Christi (now members of the Double-A South) for the 2021 season. Over 85 games, he slashed .287/.349/.491 with 14 home runs, 36 RBIs, and 15 stolen bases. He was assigned to the Sugar Land Space Cowboys of the Triple-A Pacific Coast League for the 2022 season. Over 130 games, he compiled a .270/.351/.503 slash line with 31 home runs, 89 RBIs, and 22 stolen bases.

Pedro León

Pedro Manuel León (born May 28, 1998) is a Cuban professional baseball shortstop and outfielder in the Houston Astros organization. He played for Huracanes de Mayabeque of the Cuban National Series before he defected from Cuba.

León began his professional baseball career playing for the Huracanes de Mayabeque of the Cuban National Series. In the 2017–18 season, he batted .325 with four home runs, 14 RBI, and 15 runs in 22 games. The following season, León hit .371 with 15 home runs, a 1.220 OPS and seven stolen bases in 33 games and played in the 2018 National Series All-Star Game. Considered a top international prospect for the Major Leagues, León defected from Cuba to the Dominican Republic in 2019.

León agreed to sign with the Houston Astros in February, 2020, and signed for a $4 million bonus on January 15, 2021. León was a non-roster invitee to the Astros spring training in 2021. León was reassigned to minor league camp after going 0–12 in six spring training games. He was assigned to the Double-A Corpus Christi Hooks prior to the start of the 2021 season and moved to the shortstop position. In June 2021, León was selected to play in the All-Star Futures Game. He was promoted to the Triple-A Sugar Land Skeeters on July 19, 2021, after batting .249 with nine home runs and 33 RBIs with Corpus Christi. 

León was named to the Astros' 2022 spring training roster as a non-roster invitee. He was assigned to the Triple-A Sugar Land Space Cowboys, where he spent the entire season. In 115 games with the team, León slashed .228/.365/.431 with 17 home runs, 63 RBI, and 38 stolen bases.

On January 20, 2023, it was announced that León had undergone sports hernia surgery. The recovery timetable was 6-8 weeks, causing León to miss major league Spring Training.

Alex McKenna

Alexander McKenna (born September 6, 1997) is an American professional baseball outfielder in the Houston Astros organization.

McKenna attended Bishop Alemany High School in Mission Hills, California, where he played football, basketball, and baseball. In 2015, as a senior, he batted .402. He was drafted by the Minnesota Twins in the 38th round of the 2015 Major League Baseball draft, but did not sign, instead choosing to attend California Polytechnic State University where he played college baseball for the Cal Poly Mustangs.

As a freshman at Cal Poly in 2016, McKenna batted .261 with six home runs in 45 games. After the season, he played for the Eau Claire Express of the Northwoods League. In 2017, as a sophomore, he started all 56 of Cal Poly's games and compiled a .360 batting average with five home runs, 31 RBIs, 13 steals, 45 runs scored, 11 doubles, and two triples. He was named to the All-Big West First Team after the season. That summer he played in the Cape Cod Baseball League for the Yarmouth–Dennis Red Sox where he batted .298 with nine doubles, 16 RBIs, and seven stolen bases in 124 at-bats, and was named a league all-star. In 2018, as a junior, McKenna batted .339 with five home runs, 31 RBIs, and a .930 OPS in 57 games. He was named the 2018 Big West Field Player of the Year along with being named to the All-Big West First Team for the second straight year.

McKenna was selected by the Houston Astros in the fourth round of the 2018 Major League Baseball draft and signed for $432,500. He made his professional debut that year for the Tri-City ValleyCats of the Class A Short Season New York–Penn League and was named an All-Star. He was promoted to the Quad Cities River Bandits of the Class A Midwest League in August. Over 44 games between Tri-City and Quad Cities, McKenna hit .311/.394/.512 with seven home runs and 28 RBIs. In 2019, McKenna returned to Quad Cities, but played in only 65 games due to injury; over those games, he batted .252/.327/.303 with one home run and twenty RBIs.

McKenna did not play a minor league game in 2020 due to the cancellation of the minor league season caused by the COVID-19 pandemic. To begin the 2021 season, he was assigned to the Asheville Tourists of the High-A East. He was promoted to the Corpus Christi Hooks of the Double-A Central in late June. He missed nearly a month due to injury. Over 79 games between the two teams, he slashed .261/.356/.478 with 15 home runs and 46 RBIs. He was assigned to the Sugar Land Space Cowboys of the Triple-A Pacific Coast League to begin the 2022 season, but was demoted to Corpus Christi in mid-June. He played a total of 106 games between both teams, slashing .232/.337/.351 with six home runs, 51 RBIs, and 16 stolen bases.

Jayden Murray

Jayden Allen Murray (born April 11, 1997) is an American professional baseball pitcher in the Houston Astros organization.

Murray attended Uintah High School in Vernal, Utah and played college baseball at Arizona Western College and Dixie State University. As a senior at Dixie State in 2019, he went 10-3 with a 3.78 ERA and 92 strikeouts over  innings. After his senior season, he was selected by the Tampa Bay Rays in the 23rd round of the 2019 Major League Baseball draft.

Murray signed with the Rays and made his professional debut with the Princeton Rays before he was promoted to the Hudson Valley Renegades. Over  innings between the two teams, he went 1-2 with a 2.45 ERA and 47 strikeouts. After not playing a game in 2020 due to the cancellation of the minor league season, he split the 2021 season between the Bowling Green Hot Rods and Montgomery Biscuits. Over twenty starts between the two clubs, Murray posted an 8-3 record with a 2.16 ERA and 96 strikeouts over 96 innings. He returned to Montgomery to open the 2022 season and was promoted to the Durham Bulls in late July.

The Rays traded Murray to the Houston Astros in a three-team trade on August 1, 2022, in which the Astros acquired Trey Mancini from the Baltimore Orioles, the Orioles acquired Chayce McDermott from Houston and Seth Johnson from the Tampa Bay Rays, and the Rays also acquired José Siri from the Astros. The Astros assigned him to the Corpus Christi Hooks. Over 23 games (22 starts) between Montgomery, Durham, and Corpus Christi, Murray went 8-5 with a 3.50 ERA and 99 strikeouts over 108 innings.

Dixie State Trailblazers bio

Freudis Nova

Freudis Nova (born January 12, 2000) is a Dominican professional baseball infielder in the Houston Astros organization.

The Houston Astros signed Nova as an international free agent in 2016 for a $1.2 million signing bonus. He made his professional debut in 2017 with the DSL Astros, hitting .247/.342/.355/.698 with 4 home runs and 16 RBI. He spent the 2018 season with the Gulf Coast Astros, hitting .308/.331/.466/.797 with 6 home runs and 28 RBI. Nova spent the 2019 season with the Quad Cities River Bandits, hitting .259/.301/.369/.670 with 3 home runs and 29 RBI.

Nova did not play a minor league game in 2020 due to the cancellation of the minor league season caused by the COVID-19 pandemic. Nova was added to the Astros 40-man roster following the 2020 season. Nova was placed on the 60-day injured list on September 20, 2021, after suffering a torn ACL in his left knee the week previous. Nova had hit .224/.301/.335 with 4 home runs and 19 RBI in 73 games for the High-A Asheville Tourists. On November 19, 2021, Nova was outrighted off of the 40-man roster.

José Alberto Rivera

José Alberto Rivera (born February 14, 1997) is a Dominican professional baseball pitcher for the Houston Astros organization.

Rivera signed with the Houston Astros for a $10,000 signing bonus on October 19, 2016. He made his professional debut with the DSL Astros, posting a 2–3 record and 3.44 ERA in 12 games. In 2018, Rivera split the season between the rookie-level GCL Astros and the Low-A Tri-City ValleyCats, pitching to a cumulative 2–4 record and 3.49 ERA in 14 appearances. In the 2019 season, he recorded 95 strikeouts in  innings pitched with the Single-A Quad Cities River Bandits, using a fastball that can reach . Rivera did not play in a game in 2020 due to the cancellation of the minor league season because of the COVID-19 pandemic.

The Los Angeles Angels selected Rivera from the Astros in the 2020 Rule 5 draft. On March 24, 2021, Rivera was returned to the Astros after only recording one inning of work in Spring Training. He was assigned to the High-A Asheville Tourists to begin the 2021 season.

Alex Santos

Alex Zavier Santos (born February 10, 2002) is an American professional baseball pitcher in the Houston Astros organization.

Santos grew up in The Bronx and attended Mount Saint Michael Academy. He had committed to play college baseball at Maryland.

Santos was selected in the 2nd round of the 2020 MLB draft by the Houston Astros. He signed with the team and received a $1.25 million signing bonus. Santos spent the 2021 season with the Fayetteville Woodpeckers of the Low-A East and posted a 2–2 record with a 3.46 ERA and 48 strikeouts in  innings pitched.

Jairo Solís

Jairo Jhonkleide Solís (born December 22, 1999) is a Venezuelan professional baseball pitcher in the Houston Astros organization.

Solís signed with the Houston Astros as an international free agent on July 2, 2016. Solís split his professional debut season of 2017 between the DSL Astros, Gulf Coast Astros, and the Greeneville Astros, going a combined 3–2 with a 2.64 ERA and 69 strikeouts over  innings. He spent the 2018 season with the Quad Cities River Bandits, going 2–5 with a 3.55 ERA and 51 strikeouts over  innings. He missed the 2019 season after undergoing Tommy John Surgery in January 2019.

Solís did not play a minor league game in 2020 since the minor league season was cancelled due to the COVID-19 pandemic. The Astros added Solís to their 40-man roster on November 20, 2020. On May 1, 2021, Solís underwent surgery to remove loose bodies from his elbow, requiring a recovery period of three months. On June 28, Solís underwent Tommy John surgery for the second time in his career, ending his 2021 season.

On March 15, 2022, Solís was designated for assignment by the Astros following the signing of Niko Goodrum. He was outrighted to the Triple-A Sugar Land Space Cowboys on March 18.

Will Wagner

William James Wagner (born July 29, 1998) is an American professional baseball infielder in the Houston Astros organization.

Wagner attended The Miller School of Albemarle in Charlottesville, Virginia, where his father, former MLB pitcher Billy Wagner, was his manager. He played college baseball at Liberty University for four years. He was drafted by the Houston Astros, his father's former team, in the 18th round of the 2021 Major League Baseball draft.

Wagner made his professional debut with the Fayetteville Woodpeckers and spent 2022 with the Asheville Tourists and Corpus Christi Hooks. After the season, he played in the Arizona Fall League. In 2023, the Astros invited him to Spring Training.

Shay Whitcomb

Shay Lane Whitcomb (born September 28, 1998) is an American professional baseball infielder in the Houston Astros organization.

Whitcomb attended Newbury Park High School in Newbury Park, California and played college baseball at the University of California, San Diego. In 2019, he played collegiate summer baseball with the Orleans Firebirds of the Cape Cod Baseball League. He was drafted by the Houston Astros in the fifth round of the 2020 Major League Baseball draft. He was the final player selected in the draft which was shortened due to the COVID-19 pandemic.

Whitcomb spent his first professional season in 2021 with the Fayetteville Woodpeckers and Asheville Tourists. Over 99 games between the two teams, he slashed .293/.363/.530 with 23 home runs, 78 RBIs, thirty stolen bases and 25 doubles.

Full Triple-A to Rookie League rosters

Triple-A

Double-A

High-A

Single-A

Rookie

Foreign Rookie

References

Minor league players
Lists of minor league baseball players